Eduard Peithner von Lichtenfels (18 November 1833, Vienna — 22 January 1913, Berlin) was an Austrian landscape painter. He studied at the Academy of Fine Arts, Vienna, under Franz Steinfeld and Thomas Ender. He taught landscape painting at the Academy from 1872 to 1901; his students included Alfred Roller.

Further reading

External links 
 
 Entry for Eduard Peithner von Lichtenfels on the Union List of Artist Names

19th-century Austrian painters
Austrian male painters
20th-century Austrian painters
1833 births
1913 deaths
19th-century Austrian male artists
20th-century Austrian male artists